Kalin-e Sadat (also Romanized as Kalīn-e Sādāt; also known as Kalīn-e Pā’īn  and Qal‘eh-ye Sādāt) is a village in Karimabad Rural District, Sharifabad District, Pakdasht County, Tehran Province, Iran. At the 2006 census, its population was 546, in 125 families.

References 

Populated places in Pakdasht County